The  was an army of the Imperial Japanese Army based in Manchukuo from the Russo-Japanese War until the end of World War II. During World War II it was under the overall command of the Kwantung Army.

History

Russo-Japanese War
The Japanese 5th Army, then known as the Yalu River Army, was initially raised on January 15, 1905 in the final stages of the Russo-Japanese War under the command of General Kawamura Kageaki out of only the 11th Infantry Division and three reserve brigades. It took successfully part in the battle of Mukden, when the 5th Army flanked the Russian left wing. It was disbanded at Mukden in January, 1906 after the signing of the Treaty of Portsmouth at the end of the war.

Second Sino-Japanese War and World War II
The Japanese 5th Army was raised again on December 7, 1937 in Manchukuo as a garrison force to guard the eastern borders against possible incursions by the Soviet Red Army. As it was based on the eastern frontier, it was not a participant in the Nomonhan Incident, but was temporarily disbanded on February 26, 1938. It was re-established on May 19, 1939 under the direct control of the Imperial Japanese Army General Staff. It afterwards came under the command of the Japanese First Area Army, under the overall command of the Kwantung Army, and was used primarily as a training and garrison force. Its equipment and experienced troops were siphoned off to other commands in the southeast Asia theatre of operations as the war situation gradually deteriorated for Japan. By the time of the Soviet invasion of Manchuria, its poorly equipped and poorly trained forces were no longer a match for the experienced battle-hardened Soviet armored divisions, and it was driven back into defensive positions in Andong Province along the Korean border by the time of the surrender of Japan. It was formally disbanded at Jixi.

List of Commanders

Commanding officer

Chief of Staff

Notes

References

External links

05
Military units and formations established in 1905
Military units and formations disestablished in 1945
1905 establishments in Japan